Rudy Van Drie (January 5, 1931 – October 13, 1976) was an American politician who served in the Iowa House of Representatives from the 52nd district from 1967 to 1971 and in the Iowa Senate from the 17th district from 1971 to 1973.

References

1931 births
1976 deaths
Republican Party members of the Iowa House of Representatives
Republican Party Iowa state senators
20th-century American politicians